Ewha Girls' High School is a private girls high school located in Jeong-dong, Jung-gu, Seoul, South Korea. Although managed by the same foundation, it is not to be confused with the coeducational Ewha Womans University High School (founded 1958), which is located near Ewha Woman's University in Seodaemun District and functions as the demonstration school attached to the university's College of Education.

History
Ewha Girls' High School originates from the Ewha Hakdang mission school for girls founded on May 31, 1886, by Mary F. Scranton. The school expanded to offer college-level courses, with the college section eventually separating to become Ewha Womans University. The construction of a dormitory for staff and students was completed in 1900. The current principal Kim Hye-jeong was appointed in February 2017 as the school's 15th principal.

Co-curricular activities
At Ewha Girls' High School, every student has to join a club as part of their co-curricular activities. Ewha Girls' High School has 34 clubs which can be classified into five categories — academics, performance, service, media/debate, arts/physical education.

Academics section 1

Academics section 2

Performance

Service

Media/Debate

But in 2021 Oak,ODIN and ATOM are combined one debate club named “EBATE”

Arts/Physical Education

Principals
List of principals of Ewha Girls' High School:
 1st: Mary F. Scranton (1886—1890)
 2nd: Lousia C. Rothweiler (1890—1893)
 3rd: Josephine O. Paine (1893—1907)
 4th: Lulu E. Frey (1907—1921)
 5th: A. Jeanette Walter (1921—1922)
 6th: Alice R. Appenzeller (1922—1929)
 7th: Miss E. Church (1929—1938)
 8th: Shin Bong-jo (1938—1961)
 9th: Seo Myung-hak (1961—1971)
 10th: Jeong Hui-gyeong (1971—1982)
 11th: Shim Chi-seon (1982—1995)
 12th: Choi Jong-ok (1995—2000)
 13th: Jeong Chang-yong (2000—2009)
 14th: Kang Soon-ja (2009—2017)
 15th: Kim Hye-jeong (2017–present)

Notable alumni

Academia
 Helen Kim - Educator and first woman in Korea to receive a PhD
 Park In-deok - Independence activist and educator
 Chung Hyun-back - former history professor
 Lee Gwang-ja - Former president of Seoul Women's University (2001~2013)
 Ji Eun-hee - Chair-professor at Sangji University and former president of Duksung Women's University (2006.02.28—2013.02.28)
 Cha Kwang Eun - Doctor and professor at Cha University
 So-Young Pi - Professor at Boston University

Business
 Lee Myung-hee - Chairman of Shinsegae Group
 Kim Ye-ri

Entertainment/Music
 Nam Bo-ra - Actress
 Youn Yuh-jung - Actress
 Lee Eung-kyung - Actress
 Jo Mi-ryung - Actress
 Baek Ji-won - Actress
 Jeon Ye-seo - Actress
 Tymee - Rapper
 Sa Mi-ja - Actress
 Kim Joo-ha - News anchor
 Jin Yang-hye - Announcer and MC
 Chae Seon-yeob - Pianist and soprano singer
 Song Min-doh - Singer
 Song Hye-kyo - Actress 
 Park Hye-soo - Actress
 Jungeun Kim Burke - Pianist

Literature
 Kim Iryeop - Poet, journalist, writer
 In Byung-sun - Poet
 Heo Geun-uk - Writer, novelist
 Oh Jung-hee

Politics
 Choi Young-hee - Former member of the National Assembly
 Kang Kyung-wha - Foreign Minister of South Korea
 Kim Mo-im - 36th Minister of Health and Welfare (1998.05.01—1999.05.23)
 Kim Jeong-sook - 6th Commissioner of Korea Food & Drug Administration (2004.09.04—2006.01.31)
 Kim Geum-rae - Former member of the National Assembly
 Kim Jinai - Former member of the National Assembly
 Lee Hee-ho - Former First Lady of South Korea (1998—2003)
 Lee Mi-kyung - Current member of the National Assembly
 Seo Young-hee - Former member of the National Assembly

Others
 Ryu Gwansun
 Hwang Ae-deok - Independence fighter
 Ha Ran-sa - Independence fighter
Kim Ransa - Independence fighter
Esther Pak - Korea's first female doctor of Western medicine

References

External links
 Official website 

High schools in Seoul
Jung District, Seoul
Girls' schools in South Korea
Educational institutions established in 1886
1886 establishments in Korea